The economy of Papua New Guinea (PNG) is largely underdeveloped with the vast majority of the population living below the poverty line. However, according to the Asian Development Bank its GDP is expected to grow 3.4% in 2022 and 4.6% in 2023.  It is dominated by the agricultural, forestry, and fishing sector and the minerals and energy extraction sector. The agricultural, forestry, and fishing sector accounts for most of the labour force of PNG while the minerals and energy extraction sector, including gold, copper, oil and natural gas is responsible for most of the export earnings.

PNG's GDP growth has been driven by the extraction industries and real GDP growth per capita has averaged 4% since mid-2000. The GDP Growth rate for PNG in 2021 was at 1.3%. The country has made significant progress investing proceeds from oil and gas in infrastructure building. As a result, its major cities like Port Moresby and Lae have received increased international investor attention, giving rise to an unprecedented building boom  to exploit the opportunities presented by the country's rise as a regional economic leader in the South Pacific region. This is well supported by its strategic location as a gateway from the Pacific to Asia, as well as its comparatively huge landmass and demographic profile (almost 7 times that of the rest of the smaller Pacific Island nations)

The International Monetary Fund has reported that despite PNG's poverty, it is richly endowed with natural resources, but exploitation has been hampered by the rugged terrain and the high cost of developing infrastructure. Agriculture provides a subsistence livelihood for the bulk of the population. Mineral deposits, including oil, copper, and gold, account for 72% of export earnings.

Budgetary support from Australia and development aid under World Bank auspices continue to sustain the economy. Australia is PNG's largest aid donor, and will provide  $479.2 million of aid in 2023. In June 2021 the World Bank approved a US$100 million (PGK 352 million equivalent) operation to support Papua New Guinea in its response to COVID-19, and to lay important foundations for a sustainable recovery.

Economy
According to the Investment Promotion Authority of Papua New Guinea the major economic sectors  are agriculture and livestock, forestry, mining and petroleum, tourism and hospitality, fisheries and marine resources, manufacturing, retailing and wholesaling, building and construction, transport and telecommunications, and finance and business trade. The economy generally can be separated into subsistence and market sectors, although the distinction is blurred by smallholder cash cropping of coffee, cocoa, and copra. About 75% of the country's population relies primarily on the subsistence economy. The minerals, timber, and fish sectors are dominated by foreign investors. Manufacturing is limited, and the formal labour sector consequently also is limited.

Mineral resources

In 1999, mineral production accounted for 26.3% of gross domestic product. Government revenues and foreign exchange earning minerals. Copper and gold mines are currently in production at Porgera, Ok Tedi, Misima, Lihir, Simberi and Hidden Valley. As of 2014, talks of resuming mining operations in the Panguna mine have also resurfaced, with the Autonomous Bougainville Government and National Government of Papua New Guinea expressing interest in restarting mining operations in the area.

New nickel, copper and gold projects have been identified and are awaiting a rise in commodity prices to begin development. At early 2011, there are confirmation that Mount Suckling project has found at least two new large highly prospective porphyry bodies at Araboro Creek and Ioleu Creek. A consortium led by Chevron is producing and exporting oil from the Southern Highlands Province of Papua New Guinea. In 2001, it expects to begin the commercialization of the country's estimated 640 km³ (23 trillion cubic feet) of natural gas reserves through the construction of a gas pipeline from Papua New Guinea to Queensland, Australia. The project was shelved.

In 2019, the country was the 8th largest world producer of cobalt, and the 15th largest world producer of gold. In the production of silver, in 2017 the country produced 90 tons.

Agriculture, timber, and fish

The agricultural, forestry, and fishing sector accounts for most of the labour force of PNG. Agriculture currently accounts for 25% of GDP and supports more than 80% of the population. Most agriculture is subsistence, while cash crops are exported. The main crops by value are coffee, oil, cocoa, copra, tea, rubber, and sugar. The timber industry was not active in 1998, due to low world prices, but rebounded in 1999. About 40% of the country is covered with timber rich trees, and a domestic woodworking industry has been slow to develop. Fish exports are confined primarily to shrimp, although fishing boats of other nations catch tuna in Papua New Guinea waters under license.

Papua New Guinea has the largest yam market in Asia.

Papua New Guinea produced in 2018:

 2.4 million tons of palm oil (9th largest world producer);
 1.3 million tons of banana;
 1.2 million tons of coconut (7th largest world producer);
 1.1 million tons of fruits, fresh nes;
 728 thousand tons of sweet potato (17th largest world producer);
 375 thousand tons of yam;
 356 thousand tons of root and tubers;
 325 thousand tons of vegetable;
 271 thousand tons of taro;
 241 thousand tons of maize (green);
 237 thousand tons of sugar cane;
 152 thousand tons of cassava;
 107 thousand tons of berries nes;
 57 thousand tons of coffee;
 44 thousand tons of cocoa;

In addition to smaller productions of other agricultural products, like natural rubber (7.7 thousand tons) and tea (5.5 thousand tons).

Industry
In general, the Papua New Guinea economy is highly dependent on imports for manufactured goods. Its industrial sector—exclusive of mining—accounts for only 9% of GDP and contributes little to exports. Small-scale industries produce beer, soap, concrete products, clothing, paper products, matches, ice cream, canned meat, fruit juices, furniture, plywood, and paint. The small domestic market, relatively high wages, and high transport costs are constraints to industrial development.

Telecommunications
Until the second half of 2007, information and communication technology (ICT) services in Papua New Guinea (PNG) were limited to urban centres under the monopoly operator, Telikom PNG (Mitchel 2008). Thereafter, the Irish owned utility Digicel entered the mobile market and expanded mobile signal coverage across the country enabling connectivity to many people — the mobile phone penetration rate reached 41 per cent by 2014, marking a substantial change in the communications landscape. PNG has 42.68 mobile phone users per 100 population, estimated in 2017.
PNG has a low level of broadband uptake, estimated in 2017 at 0.213 per 100 population.

Energy
Particularly in rural areas there is reliance on traditional sources of biomass energy for cooking.

Electricity

Access to electricity
By 2017, only 50.42%  of the rural population had access to electricity.
80.23% of the urban population in 2017 had access to electricity. Limitations in the transmission and distribution infrastructure lead to frequent outages in urban centers.

Consumption
Electricity - consumption: 3.116 billion kWh (2012 est.)

Generation
Electricity - production: 3.35 billion kWh (2012 est.)

Transmission and distribution
PNG Power Ltd (PPL) operates three separate grids. There are two main large grids, the Port Moresby system serving the National Capital District and the large Ramu grid that extends into the highlands. Also, PPL operates the small Gazelle Peninsula Grid powered mainly by a 10 MW run-of-river hydro plant.

Entities and institutions
The Electricity Commission (ELCOM) was privatised with the passage of the Electricity Commission (Privatization) Act 2002. PNG Power Limited (PPL) is a vertically integrated utility responsible for generation, transmission, distribution and retailing of electricity throughout Papua New Guinea.

Electricity generation by source

Renewable energy
A study by Bloomberg New Energy Finance ranked PNG in the top 10 for potential renewable resources, with about 2.5 GW of these but only 2% of it exploited.

Hydroelectric projects
The Yonki Dam project, which commenced operation in 1991, on the Ramu River has generation capacity of 77 MW (103,000 hp) (Ramu 1) plus proposed additional capacity of 18 MW.

Proposed projects
The list of intended projects include the US$2 billion Ramu 2 hydro project on the Ramu River to be built under a public-private partnership with Shenzen Energy Group.

Edevu Dam is to be constructed by PNG Hydro Development Ltd (PNGHDL) to generate 50 Megawatts (MW).

Consultants to PNG Power have conducted feasibility studies for the Naoro Brown hydroelectricity Project which would supply up to 80MW of electricity to the Port Moresby grid.

Transport

Transport in Papua New Guinea is in many cases heavily limited by the mountainous terrain.  The capital, Port Moresby, is not linked by road to any of the other major towns and many highland villages can only be reached by light aircraft or on foot.

Papua New Guinea has no major railways, but some mine sites have disused tracks.

The country has  of waterways, and commercial port facilities at Port Moresby, Alotau, Oro Bay, Lae, Kimbe, Kieta Madang, Buka, Rabaul/Kokopo, Kiunga, Wewak and Vanimo.

Finance
The Bank of Papua New Guinea (BPNG) is the central bank of Papua New Guinea. Its main function is to issue currency and to act as the banker and financial agent to the Government. It is also in charge of regulating banking and other financial services and manages the gold, foreign exchange and any other international reserves of Papua New Guinea.

BPNG is engaged in developing policies to promote financial inclusion and is a member of the Alliance for Financial Inclusion, which had been formed in 2008. In 2013, BPNG made a Maya Declaration Commitment to create an enabling environment for building an inclusive financial sector in Papua New Guinea.

The currency of Papua New Guinean, issued by the BPNG, is the kina, which was introduced on 19 April 1975 to replace the Australian dollar.

Trade and investment
In 2014, Papua New Guinea's merchandise exports were:
 41%   fuels and mining;
 23.8% agriculture;
 6.2%  manufacturing; and
 29%   other.

Major destinations for merchandise exports include Australia (39.9%), the European Union (20.2%), Japan (11.7%), China (6.7%), and Singapore (5.6%).

In 2014, Papua New Guinea's merchandise imports were:
 17.8%	 fuels and mining;
 11.4%	 agriculture;
 69.4%	 manufacturing; and
 1.4%	 other.

Major source countries for merchandise imports include Australia (34.4%), Singapore (14.3%), the European Union (8.3%), China (6.9%), and Japan (6.4%).

Petroleum, mining machinery and aircraft have been the primary U.S. exports to Papua New Guinea. In 1999, as mineral exploration and new minerals investments declined, as did United States exports. Crude oil is the largest U.S. import from Papua New Guinea, followed by gold, cocoa, coffee, and copper ore.

U.S. companies are active in developing Papua New Guinea's mining and petroleum sectors. Chevron operates the Kutubu and Gobe oil projects and is developing its natural gas reserves. A 5,000–6,000 m³ (30,000–40,000 barrel) per day oil refinery project in which there is an American interest also is under development in Port Moresby.

In 1993, Papua New Guinea became a participating economy in the Asia-Pacific Economic Cooperation (APEC) Forum. In 1996, it joined the World Trade Organization (WTO).

Development programs and aid
Papua New Guinea is highly dependent on foreign aid. Australia has been the largest bilateral aid donor to PNG, providing $A506 million ($US376 million) in 2016. Budgetary support, which has been provided in decreasing amounts since independence, was phased out in 2000, with aid concentrated on project development.

Other major aid sources to Papua New Guinea are Japan, the European Union, the People's Republic of China, the Republic of China, the United Nations, the Asian Development Bank, the International Monetary Fund, and the World Bank. Volunteers from a number of countries, including the United States, and mission church workers also provide education, health, and development assistance throughout the country.

Economic conditions
By mid-1999, Papua New Guinea's economy was in crisis. Although its agricultural sector had recovered from the 1997 drought and timber prices were rising as most Asian economies recovered from their 1998 slump, Papua New Guinea's foreign currency earnings suffered from low world mineral and petroleum prices. Estimates of minerals in exploration expenditure in 1999 were one-third of what was spent in 1997. The resulting lower foreign exchange earnings, capital flight, and general government mismanagement resulted in a precipitous drop in the value of Papua New Guinea's currency, the kina, leading to a dangerous decrease in foreign currency reserves. The kina has floated since 1994. Economic activity decreased in most sectors; imports of all kinds shrunk; and inflation, which had been over 21% in 1998, slowed to an estimated annual rate of 8% in 1999.

Citing the previous government's failure to successfully negotiate acceptable commercial loans or bond sales to cover its budget deficit, the government formed by Sir Mekere Morauta in July 1999 successfully requested emergency assistance from the International Monetary Fund and the World Bank. With assistance from the Fund and the Bank, the government has made considerable progress toward macroeconomic stabilization and economic reform.

As of 2019, although statistics show that an economic recovery is underway, Papua New Guinea's economy is still struggling.

Main indicators 
The following table shows the main economic indicators in 1980–2017.

Statistics

Household income or consumption by percentage share:
lowest 10%:
4.3%
highest 10%:
36% (2008)

Labour force:
2.078 million

Electricity – production:
2,200 GWh (2008)

Electricity – production by source:
fossil fuel:
67.78%
hydro:
32.22%
nuclear:
0%
other:
0% (2008)

Electricity – consumption:
2,000 GWh (2008)

Electricity exports:
10 kWh (2008)

Electricity – imports:
0 kWh (2008)

Agriculture – products:
coffee, cocoa, coconuts, palm kernels, tea, rubber, sweet potatoes, fruit, vegetables; poultry, pork, vanilla

Currency:
1 kina (K) = 100 toea

Exchange rates:
kina (K) per US$1 – 3.14 (April 2016), 2.7624 (November 1999), 2.520 (1999), 2.058 (1998), 1.434 (1997), 1.318 (1996), 1.276 (1995)

See also

 COVID-19 pandemic in Papua New Guinea

References

External links
 PNG Survey of Recent (Economic) Developments: 2014–15, Australian National University / University of Papua New Guinea, September 2015
 PNG Economics, a blog by former Australian and Papua New Guinean Treasury official, Paul Flanagan
 The PNG Chamber of Commerce and Industry, a peak body for business representation in Papua New Guinea

 
Economics in developing countries
Papua New Guinea